Sendik's Food Market (Sendik's) is a supermarket chain with 18 stores in the Greater Milwaukee area. Sendik's also operates four Fresh2Go stores.

History 
Sendik's was founded in 1926. Sendik's was named the Milwaukee Journal Sentinel's Top Employer in 2012 and has kept the award every year since. It opened its first smaller-size store under the Fresh2Go banner in late 2015. Also in 2015, Sendik's became the first grocery store in Wisconsin to convert food waste into energy.

Products 
Sendik's sells traditional name-brand products as well as private label brands. It also offers a full-service catering line and many made-to-order foods like sushi.

Partnerships 
In association with the Milwaukee Brewers, Sendik's makes contributions to the MACC Fund.

References

External links

Supermarkets of the United States
Retail companies established in 1926
Companies based in Milwaukee
1926 establishments in Wisconsin
American companies established in 1926